Yokouchi (written: 横内) is a Japanese surname. Notable people with the surname include:

, Japanese footballer
, Japanese politician
, Japanese actor
, Japanese musician

Japanese-language surnames